The Center for Armenian Research and Publication (Armenian Research Center) was established by Dr. Dennis R. Papazian in 1985 for the documentation/publication in the field of Armenian studies. The Armenian Research Center is the only such research institute devoted to the study of the Armenians at any U.S. university. 

In partial fulfillment of its stated goal above, the Armenian Research Center controls a library, which was named the John Vigen Der Manuelian Research Library because the core of the collection comes from the Boston-area educator and community activist. The Archives, as yet unnamed.

See also 
University of Michigan–Dearborn
Denial of the Armenian genocide
Armenian genocide

References

External links 
 

Armenian-American culture in Michigan
Historiography of Armenia